Timmy Ma Hei Wai (born 3 February 2004) is a Hong Kong professional footballer who currently plays as a midfielder for Hong Kong Premier League club Eastern.

Club career
On 1 November 2020, Ma made his professional debut for Eastern in a Sapling Cup match against Southern.

References

External links
 HKFA

2004 births
Living people
Hong Kong footballers
Association football midfielders
Eastern Sports Club footballers
Hong Kong Premier League players